SOJA (an acronym of Soldiers of Jah Army) is an American  Grammy-award winning reggae band based in Arlington, Virginia. Formed in 1997, their music is currently produced under ATO Records. The eight-member band has released a number of singles, albums, and DVDs, including SOJA – Live in Hawaii. Their third full-length album Born in Babylon peaked at #11 on the Top Heatseekers chart, while their 2012 album Strength to Survive topped the Billboard Reggae Album Chart. The band continues to tour and record new music.

History

1997–05: Founding, early releases
Before the band was founded, the members had performed together on and off for some years. Frontman Jacob Hemphill (vocals, guitar) and Bob Jefferson (bass) met in first grade shortly after Hemphill had returned with his family from living in Africa, where Jacob's father was the IMF resident representative in Monrovia, Liberia. Hemphill and Jefferson then met Ryan Berty (drums), and Ken Brownell (percussion) in middle school and high school.

Creeping In (1998)

After forming SOJA in 1997, Jacob Hemphill, Bob Jefferson, Ryan "Byrd" Berty and Kenneth Brownell recorded their first album Creeping In in 1998.

SOJA EP (2000)

They released their first EP, self-titled SOJA, independently with sound engineer Jim Fox at LION and FOX Recording Studios in 2000. It was positively received. 

Peace in Time of War (2002)

The band also released their first full-length album, Peace in a Time of War in 2002.

SOJA released a Dub version of their Peace in a Time of War album titled, Dub in a Time of War in 2005.

2006–09: Releases with label

Get Wiser (2006)

In 2006, the band released Get Wiser, their second full-length album, and their first on the record label Innerloop. It debuted in the Top 10 Reggae Albums on iTunes and has remained in the top 100 since its release. The album release party was held on January 6, 2006 at The State Theatre in Falls Church, Virginia. It consisted of two separate sets, with the opening set being older songs, and the second set being Get Wiser in its entirety. The show was recorded and was released as a DVD, known as the Get Wiser Live DVD, on November 21, 2007.

Stars & Stripes EP (2008)

In January 2008, they released an EP titled, Stars and Stripes. That same month in Hawaii, SOJA recorded their live performances in Oahu, Maui, and Kailua-Kona. Those performances were released as a DVD, known as the SOJA – Live in Hawaii, on January 8, 2009.

2009–12: Steady album releases
The band had released one major album and toured largely in Virginia. A great promotional effort by Nick Yuen in the release of their new live album Live in Virginia.

Born in Babylon (2009)

SOJA released their third full-length album Born in Babylon on August 21, 2009, on DMV Records. It peaked at #11 on the Top Heatseekers chart, and reached #38 on the Independent Albums chart. Trevor Young, formerly SOJA's guitar tech, became lead guitar and backup vocals in late 2011.

Strength to Survive (2012)

The band released their fourth album, Strength to Survive on January 31, 2012, their first album on ATO Records. It sold over 50,000 copies, and topped the Billboard Reggae Album Chart in both 2012 and 2013. It was also #9 for the year end Reggae Albums chart on Billboard, and reached #36 on the Billboard 200, as well as #2 on the Independent Albums chart. It received 3.5/5 stars from Allmusic, with the website praising the band's growth as songwriters and Hemphill's vocal developments. While Allmusic criticized the non-reggae acoustic tracks at the end of the album, it stated that overall "You've got one of the best American reggae albums of the year."

Amid the Noise and Haste (2014)

In 2014, they released their fifth album, Amid the Noise and Haste on ATO Records. Produced by Supa Dups, the album was recorded throughout 2013. Guest artists include Damian Marley, J Boog, Anuhea, and Collie Buddz. Hemphill penned the lyrics, chords, and melodies of the songs. The album topped the Billboard Reggae Albums chart, and received a Grammy nomination in the "Best Reggae Album" category.

Poetry in Motion (2017)

In October 2017, they released their sixth album, Poetry in Motion on the ATO label with the following songs: "Moving Stones", "I Can't Stop Dreaming", "Tried My Best", "More", "Fire in the Sky", "Everything to Me", "Life Support", "Bad News", "To Whom It May Concern", "Sing to Me", and "I Found You".

In 2018, SOJA booked some festivals in the U.S. and toured in Europe in the summer.

2019–present: Recent years

On May 22, 2020, SOJA was featured as one of many reggae bands on Collie Buddz riddim album, Cali Roots Riddim 2020 with their single, "A Brief History", which was produced by Collie Buddz and mixed by Stick Figure's touring guitarist, producer Johnny Cosmic.

Beauty in the Silence (2021)
After a three year hiatus, SOJA released their seventh studio album, Beauty In Silence on September 24, 2021. Parts of the album were recorded at Inner Circle's legendary Circle House Studios in Miami, Florida by Niko Marzouca and Rob Marks. It was also recorded at New Jersey's Sterling Sound and Dave Matthews' Haunted Hollow Studio in Charlottesville, Virginia. Featured album guest artists include: Collie Buddz, Dirty Heads, J Boog, Nanpa Basico, Rebelution, Slightly Stoopid, Stick Figure, and UB40.

The album debuted at No. 2 on the Billboard Reggae Albums charts. It also debuted at No. 34 on Billboard's Current Albums Sales chart, and No. 52 on Billboard's Top Album Sales chart. Billboard describes the album as, "Contemporary reggae with a forthright social conscience."

According to SOJA's Facebook page, Beauty in the Silence is being considered for the 64th Annual Grammy Awards for Best Reggae Album. Also, their song "Press Rewind" featuring Collie Buddz and J Boog is being considered for Best Global Music Performance.

In December 2021, SOJA was nominated for the fans-choice "2021 Album of the Year" award by Surf Roots TV & Radio for their album Beauty in the Silence. Voting was determined by Facebook, Instagram and Twitter users. This was the band's first time being nominated with the reggae rock streaming TV channel on Amazon Fire TV, Apple TV, and Roku. 

On April 3, 2022, SOJA won their first Grammy Award for Best Reggae Album for 2021's Beauty in the Silence at the 64th Annual Grammy Awards. This was their third nomination since 2015. They also made history for being the first American Reggae-Rock group to win the award.

Lineup

Current members

Jacob Hemphill – lead vocals, guitar (1997–present)
Bobby "Lee" Jefferson – bass, vocals (1997–present)
Ryan "Bird" Berty – drums (1997–present)
Ken Brownell – percussion (1997–present)
Patrick O'Shea – keyboards (2002–present)
Hellman Escorcia – saxophone (2012–present)
Rafael Rodriguez – trumpet (2012–present)
Trevor Young – lead guitar, guest lead vocals (2014–present)

Discography

Studio albums

Live albums

EPs

Singles

Songs

DVDs

Production credits

Further reading
 "Interview: Band SOJA marches on", Jamaica Observer, 24 May 2013.
SOJA Discography at Allmusic
SOJA Discography at Discogs

See also
Reggae
List of reggae artists

References

External links

 SOJA Website
SOJA on YouTube
SOJA on Facebook
SOJA on Twitter

American reggae musical groups
Musical groups from Virginia
Reggae rock groups
Musical groups established in 1997
1997 establishments in Virginia
ATO Records artists